Wladimir Rudolfowitsch Vogel (17 February/29 February 1896 – 19 June 1984) was a Swiss composer of German and Russian descent.

Life
Born in Moscow, Vogel first studied composition in Moscow with Alexander Scriabin, then between 1918 and 1924 with Heinz Tiessen and Ferruccio Busoni in Berlin, where he subsequently taught (1929–33) at the Klindworth-Scharwenka Conservatory. He was close to the expressionist circle around Herwarth Walden and was active (together with George Antheil, Hanns Eisler, Philipp Jarnach, Stefan Wolpe, and Kurt Weill) in the music section of the November Group of Max Butting and Hans Heinz Stuckenschmidt.

In 1933, branded a "degenerate artist" by the Nazi regime, he left Germany and went to Strasbourg, Brussels, Paris, and London. He first turned to twelve-tone technique with his Violin Concerto in 1937. From 1939 he lived in Switzerland, at first in Ascona and from 1964 in Zürich. Until he became a Swiss citizen in 1954, he was not allowed to work in Switzerland, and relied on the support of wealthy patrons and his wife, the writer Aline Valangin. During this time, he taught composition privately, was active in the ISCM, participated in Hermann Scherchen’s ‘Sessions d’études musicales et dramatiques’ in Strasbourg, and organized the International Twelve-Tone Music pre-conference in Osilina in 1949. His students include Erik Bergman, Tauno Marttinen, Maurice Karkoff, Rodolfo Holzmann, Robert Suter, Einojuhani Rautavaara, Rolf Liebermann and Hermann Meier. 

He died in Zurich.

Compositions (selective list)
Vogel composed a symphony, pieces for orchestra, string orchestra, wind ensemble, a concerto for violin and another for cello, works for choir, soloists and orchestra—the most important of which, called "drama-oratorios", are based on a synthesis of speech and song—and chamber-music works.

 Drei Sprechlieder nach August Stramm for baritone and piano (1922)
 Sinfonischer Vorgang for large orchestra (1922–23)
 Wagadus Untergang durch die Eitelkeit, drama-oratorio (1930)
 Sinfonia fugata for large orchestra (1930–1932)
 Vier Etüden for large orchestra (1930–1932)
 Variétude for piano (1931)
 Rallye for orchestra (1932)
 Violin Concerto (1937)
 Thyl Claes, Parts I and II, drama-oratorio (1941–42 and 1943–45)
 In memoriam, Two Sonnets by Roger Vuataz for contralto, viola, harp and timpani, VWV 42 (1947)
 Jona ging doch nach Ninive, drama-oratorio (1957–58)
 Meditazione sulla maschera di Modigliani, drama-oratorio (1960)
 An die akademische Jugend (Notker Balbulus) for mixed choir a cappella (1962)
 Worte (Hans Arp) for 2 speaking voices and strings (1962)
 Flucht, drama-oratorio (1963–64)
 Mondträume (Hans Arp), permutations and paraphrases after verses from Mondsand by Hans Arp for speaking choir a cappella (1965)
 Hörformen I for orchestra (1967)
 Hörformen II for orchestra (1967–69)
 Gli spaziali drama-oratorio (1970–71)
 Abschied for string orchestra (1973)
 Vier Versionen einer Zwölftonfolge for piano (1973)
 Meloformen for string orchestra (1974)
 Hommage nach einer 6-Tonfolge von Hermann Jöhr for strings in variable scoring (1975)
 Composition for chamber orchestra (1976)
 In Signum IM for large orchestra (1976)
 Verstrebungen for chamber orchestra (1977)
 Kleine Hörformen for viola and piano, VWV 51 (1979)
 Reigen for chamber orchestra (1981)
 Humoreske, Paraphrasen über 2 Themen von Gottschalk and Tschaikowsky for large orchestra (1981)
 Trio for three clarinets (1982)
 Klangexpressionen (Bulgakov), string quartet (1983)
 Colori e movimenti for orchestra (1983)

References

External links
 Sound recordings of works of the composer from the archives of SRG SSR on Neo.Mx3

1896 births
1984 deaths
20th-century classical composers
Emigrants from Nazi Germany to Switzerland
Musicians from Moscow
Pupils of Ferruccio Busoni
Russian classical composers
Russian male classical composers
Russian people of German descent
Swiss classical composers
20th-century Russian male musicians
20th-century Swiss composers